Ryan McGlynn (born November 22, 1974) is an American former stock car racing driver and was the co-owner of McGlynn Racing along with his father Raynard "Ray" McGlynn. Together they managed the No. 74 Nextel Cup Series team with drivers Derrike Cope and himself. The team closed in 2007.

McGlynn is also a NASCAR driver, with experience in the Craftsman Truck Series as well as some scattered attempts at the Nextel Cup Series.

In 2000, he was in a crash at Evergreen Speedway, where he hit the tire barrier in the second turn, which resulted in his truck rolling over.

Motorsports career results

NASCAR
(key) (Bold – Pole position awarded by qualifying time. Italics – Pole position earned by points standings or practice time. * – Most laps led.)

Nextel Cup Series

Craftsman Truck Series

References

External links
 

1974 births
Living people
NASCAR drivers
NASCAR team owners
People from Luzerne County, Pennsylvania
Racing drivers from Pennsylvania